The Ionia Correctional Facility (ICF), also known as "I-Max" after its maximum security housing units, is a U.S. state prison located in Ionia, Michigan.

The prison was opened in 1987 and consists of five maximum security level V housing units and two medium security level II housing units.  It is one of four maximum security men's prison facilities in Michigan, along with Marquette Branch Prison in Marquette, Alger Correctional Facility in Munising, and Baraga Correctional Facility in Baraga. (The Standish Maximum Correctional Facility in Standish was a fifth maximum security men's prison until its closure in 2009 eliminating 604 Level V security beds.) Although the Ionia Correctional Facility was once the state's only supermax prison, Michigan downgraded the facility from a level VI (or supermax) to a level V maximum security prison in 2004.

Three of the level V housing units are designated 'general population'.  The remaining two are used for administrative segregation (a unit in which prisoners are confined to their cells for breaking prison rules), temporary segregation, detention, and secure outpatient treatment.  The level II facility consists of a 280-bed building separated into two units.  Level II prisoners have access to a variety of recreational activities and are allowed to work in the prison and for Michigan State Industries, a factory that employs low-risk prisoners.

See also

 List of Michigan state prisons

References

External links
Ionia Correctional Facility

Prisons in Michigan
Buildings and structures in Ionia County, Michigan
1987 establishments in Michigan